Cavallini is a surname. Notable people with the surname include:

 Ernesto Cavallini, Italian clarinetist
 Gino Cavallini (born 1962), Canadian ice hockey player 
 Leonardo Cavallini Italian bobsledder 
 Lucas Cavallini (born 1992), Canadian soccer player
 Paul Cavallini (born 1965), Canadian ice hockey player
 Pietro Cavallini (c. 1250 – c. 1330), Italian painter

Italian-language surnames